Silver oxide is the chemical compound with the formula Ag2O.  It is a fine black or dark brown powder that is used to prepare other silver compounds.

Preparation

Silver oxide can be prepared by combining aqueous solutions of silver nitrate and an alkali hydroxide. This reaction does not afford appreciable amounts of silver hydroxide due to the favorable energetics for the following reaction:
2 AgOH  ->  Ag2O  +  H2O (pK = 2.875)
With suitably controlled conditions, this reaction can be used to prepare Ag2O powder with properties suitable for several uses including as a fine grained conductive paste filler.

Structure and properties
Ag2O features linear, two-coordinate Ag centers linked by tetrahedral oxides. It is isostructural with Cu2O. It "dissolves" in solvents that degrade it.  It is slightly soluble in water due to the formation of the ion  and possibly related hydrolysis products. It is soluble in ammonia solution, producing active compound of Tollens' reagent. A slurry of Ag2O is readily attacked by acids:
Ag2O  +  2 HX  -> 2 AgX  +  H2O
where HX = HF, HCl, HBr, HI, or CF3COOH. It will also react with solutions of alkali chlorides to precipitate silver chloride, leaving a solution of the corresponding alkali hydroxide.

Despite the photosensitivity of many silver compounds, silver oxide is not photosensitive, although it readily decomposes at temperatures above 280 °C.

Applications
This oxide is used in silver-oxide batteries. In organic chemistry, silver oxide is used as a mild oxidizing agent.  For example, it oxidizes aldehydes to carboxylic acids.  Such reactions often work best when the silver oxide is prepared in situ from silver nitrate and alkali hydroxide.

References

External links

 Annealing of Silver Oxide – Demonstration experiment: Instruction and video

Silver compounds
Transition metal oxides